This is a partial list of artificial objects left on extraterrestrial surfaces.

Artificial objects on Venus

Artificial objects on the Moon

Artificial objects on Mars

Artificial objects on other extraterrestrial bodies

Estimated total masses of objects

Gallery

See also

 Sample return mission and Moon rock
 List of artificial objects leaving the Solar System
 List of landings on extraterrestrial bodies

References

Spaceflight
Space lists
Extra-terrestrial